Tom O'Brien (July 25, 1890 – June 8, 1947) was an American silent and sound character actor known for his burly serio-comic roles.

He worked in the comedy film The Gentleman from America (1923) as Johnny Day, which is about the humorous tale of two American buddies (O'Brien and Hoot Gibson) and they have numerous adventures in Spain. Tom O'Brien appeared in over 80 films in a 22 years of career. He was primarily cast as stocky "Irish types" in comic supporting roles. He also worked in The Big Parade (1925) as Corporal Bull O'Hara.

He was buried at Forest Lawn Memorial Park, Glendale.

Filmography

Feature films

 The Murder in the Museum (1934) as Alfred Carr
 The Woman Condemned (1934) as First Detective
 Only Yesterday (1933)
 Lucky Dog (1933) as The Detective
 It's a Cinch (1932) as Spike
 The Night Mayor (1932) as Delaney
 The Phantom Express (1932) as Red Connelly, the Telegraph Operator
 The Unexpected Father (1932) as Policeman
 The Phantom (1931) as Police Sgt. Pat Collins
 Hell-Bent for Frisco (1931) as Fogarty
 Trapped (1931) as Joe Farley
 The Hawk (1931) as Killdane
 Midnight Special (1930) as Dan Padden
 Moby Dick (1930) as Starbuck
 Call of the West (1930) as Bull Clarkson
 Dance Hall (1929) as Truck Driver
 Dark Skies (1929) as Pete
 The Talk of Hollywood (1929) as Reel-Mixing Projectionist
 Untamed (1929) as Moran
 Broadway Scandals (1929) as Bill Gray
 Hurricane (1929) as Dugan
 Smiling Irish Eyes (1929) as Black Barney
 The Flying Fool (1929) as Tom Dugan
 His Lucky Day (1929) as James, the Chauffeur
 It Can Be Done (1929) as Detective
 The Peacock Fan (1929) as Sgt. O'Brien
 The Office Scandal (1929) as Pool Hall Lookout
 The Last Warning (1929) as Inspector
 The Chorus Kid (1928) as Bill Whipple
 Anybody Here Seen Kelly? (1928) as Buck Johnson
 San Francisco Nights (1928) as 'Red'
 Outcast Souls (1928) as Officer
 That's My Daddy (1927) as Officer Patrick Moran
 The Private Life of Helen of Troy (1927) as Ulysses
 The Bugle Call (1927) as Sgt. Doolan
 Twelve Miles Out (1927) as Irish
 The Frontiersman (1927) as Abner Hawkins
 Rookies (1927) as Sgt. O'Brien
 Winners of the Wilderness (1927) as Timothy
 The Fire Brigade (1926) as Joe O'Neil
 Tin Hats (1926) as Sergeant McGurk
 The Flaming Forest (1926) as Mike
 The Winner (1926) as Slugger Martin
 Take It from Me (1926) as Taxi Driver
 The Runaway Express (1926) as Sandy McPherson
 Poker Faces (1926) as The Prizefighter
 Sally, Irene and Mary (1925) as Stage Manager
 The Last Edition (1925) as Bull, Job Foreman
 The Big Parade (1925) as Bull
 Crack o' Dawn (1925) as Stanley Steele
White Fang (1925) as Matt
 Winning a Woman (1925) as Unknown role
 So This Is Marriage? (1924) as Riley
 Winner Take All (1924) as Dynamite Galloway
 Never Say Die (1924) as Gun Murray
 What Shall I Do? (1924) as Big Jim Brown
 Untamed Youth (1924) as Jim Larson
 Fools Highway (1924) as Philadelphia O'Brien
 Flapper Wives (1924) as Tim Callahan
 Tipped Off (1923) as Jim 'Pug' Murphy, Mildred's Brother
 The Gentleman from America (1923) as Johnny Day
 The Scarlet Car (1923) as Mitt Deagon
 Youth to Youth (1922) as Ralph Horry
 Up and Going (1922) as Sergeant Langley
 Their Mutual Child (1921) as Steve Dingle
 The Devil Within (1921) as Wansley
 Scrap Iron (1921) as Battling Burke
 The Sagebrusher (1920) as Charlie Dornewald
 Dangerous Hours (1919) as Bolshevik at Meeting
 Square Deal Sanderson (1919) as Williams
 The Mints of Hell (1919) as Unknown role

Short films
 Fun in the Clouds (1928, short) as The Director
 Pardon My Glove (1922, short) as The Champ
 Bucking Broadway (1922, short) as The Stage Manager
 A Hickory Hick (1922, short) as The Crooked Crook
 Plumb Crazy (1923, short) as Olie Margerine
 Spooks and Spasms (1917, short) as The Big V Riot Squad
 The Runaway Freight (1914, short) as Slim, a Yeggman
 McCarn Plays Fate (1914, short) as Bull Klein

References

Bibliography

External links
 

1890 births
1947 deaths
American male silent film actors
20th-century American male actors